Yves Lapierre may refer to:
 Yves Lapierre (composer)
 Yves Lapierre (civil servant)